The 2014 Northeast Conference baseball tournament began on May 22 and ended on May 25, 2014, at Dodd Stadium in Norwich, Connecticut.  The league's top four finishers competed in the double elimination tournament.   won the tournament for the second time, earning the NEC's automatic bid to the 2014 NCAA Division I baseball tournament.

Seeding and format
The top four finishers were seeded one through four based on conference regular-season winning percentage. They then played a double-elimination tournament.

Bracket

All-Tournament Team
The following players were named to the All-Tournament Team. Bryant pitcher Craig Schlitter, one of four Bulldogs selected, was named Most Valuable Player.

References

Tournament
Northeast Conference Baseball Tournament
Northeast Conference baseball tournament
Northeast Conference baseball tournament